Gold River (1977–1986) was a French Thoroughbred racehorse best known for winning France's most prestigious race, the Prix de l'Arc de Triomphe.

Background
Gold River was owned and bred by Jacques Wertheimer, the president of the French perfumery, Chanel. Gold River was sired by Riverman.

Racing career
Gold River's first Group One win came in the 1980 Prix Royal-Oak. The following year she finished third in the Royal-Oak but won the Prix Jean Prat and the Prix du Cadran. In the Prix de l'Arc de Triomphe, Gold River was ridden to victory by jockey Gary W. Moore. In her Arc win, Gold River defeated Bikala and the American-bred filly, April Run.

Breeding record
Following her retirement from racing, Gold River served as a broodmare at Hagyard Farm in Lexington, Kentucky. Her offspring included the stakes winners Riviere d'Or (Prix Saint-Alary) and Goldneyev (Prix Yacowlef). Riviere d'Or in turn produced Gold Splash and was the grand-dam of Goldikova.

Gold River died in 1986 and is buried in Hagyard Farm's equine cemetery.

Pedigree

References

1977 racehorse births
Racehorses bred in Orne
Racehorses trained in France
Arc winners
Thoroughbred family 22-d